Allen Fisher Lissette  (6 November 1919 – 24 January 1973) was a New Zealand cricketer who played in two Tests in 1956.

Cricket career
A left-arm orthodox spinner, Lissette played for Waikato in the Hawke Cup from 1938 to 1970. He was 35 when he made his first-class debut in 1954–55 for Auckland.

After taking 7 for 50 in Auckland's victory over Otago in the Plunket Shield in January 1956 and four wickets against the touring West Indians in his next match, Lissette was selected for the first two Tests of the series against West Indies. He took three wickets, but New Zealand lost both matches by an innings, and he was not selected again.

When the Northern Districts team was formed for the 1956–57 season he joined them and played for them until 1962–63, the season they won their first Plunket Shield. He captained Northern Districts in the 1957–58 season, and took five wickets in their first victory, over Central Districts that season. His best innings and match figures in first-class cricket came in the match against Otago in 1959–60, when he took 7 for 45 and 5 for 64; Otago nevertheless won by 72 runs.

Later life
Lissette was a squadron leader in the Royal New Zealand Air Force, and in the 1966 Queen's Birthday Honours, he was appointed a Member of the Military Division of the Order of the British Empire.

He suffered a heart attack during a club game in October 1972 and died the following January, aged 53.

See also
 List of Auckland representative cricketers

References

External links

1919 births
1973 deaths
New Zealand Test cricketers
New Zealand cricketers
Auckland cricketers
Northern Districts cricketers
People from Morrinsville
New Zealand Members of the Order of the British Empire
Royal New Zealand Air Force personnel
Cricketers from Waikato